Sphex nudus, the katydid wasp, is a species of thread-waisted wasp in the family Sphecidae.

References

Further reading

External links

 

Sphecidae
Insects described in 1903